The C-8 Eightster was a single-engine airliner developed by Granville Brothers Aircraft that did not go into production.

Design and development
The C-8 was an uncompleted design for a single-engine airliner, a wire-braced low-wing monoplane with conventional landing gear and a radial engine. Entry was from a small left rear door in the fuselage. Passenger visibility came from three semi-circular windows along each side. The main landing gear was faired similar to the Gee-Bee racers.

The Granville brothers also designed a series of sportster derivatives, including the C-4 Fourster and C-6 Sixster. The C-8 was the only one to be constructed, being partially completed by the time the company went into liquidation.

Variants
Gee Bee C Sportster Single-seat sport / racing aircraft; basis for the C family. 
C-4 Fourster Four-seater powered by a  Pratt & Whitney R-985 Wasp Junior, not built.
C-6 Sixster Six-seater, not built.
C-8 Eightster Eight-seater, to have been powered by either a Pratt & Whitney R-1690 Hornet or a  Wright R-1820. The prototype was partially complete at the time of Granville Brothers bankruptcy.

Specifications (C-8)

See also

References

1930s United States civil utility aircraft
Low-wing aircraft